Harold Robinson may refer to:

 Harold E. Robinson (born 1932), botanist and entomologist
 Hal Robinson (born 1952), classical double bass player
 Harold Roper Robinson (1889–1955), physicist and university administrator
 Harold Robinson (baseball), American baseball player
 Harold B. Robinson (1922–1994), bishop of the Episcopal Diocese of Western New York
 Harold Robinson (athlete) (1930–2006), pioneering African-American athlete in Kansas State Wildcats
 Harold Claude Robinson, Northern Irish politician for Larne

See also
 Harry Robinson (disambiguation)